ImageNets is an open source framework for rapid prototyping of machine vision algorithms, developed by the Institute of Automation.

Description 
ImageNets is an open source and platform independent (Windows & Linux) framework for rapid prototyping of machine vision algorithms. With the GUI ImageNet Designer, no programming knowledge is required to perform operations on images. A configured ImageNet can be loaded and executed from C++ code without the need for loading the ImageNet Designer GUI to achieve higher execution performance.

History 
ImageNets was developed by the Institute of Automation, University of Bremen, Germany. The software was first publicly released in 2010. Originally, ImageNets was developed for the Care-Providing Robot FRIEND but it can be used for a wide range of computer vision applications.

References

External links
 ImageNets homepage
 Download ImageNets

Computer vision software
Learning in computer vision